Alfonso Segovia (born 6 July 1945) is a Spanish equestrian. He competed at the 1972 Summer Olympics and the 1976 Summer Olympics.

References

1945 births
Living people
Spanish male equestrians
Olympic equestrians of Spain
Equestrians at the 1972 Summer Olympics
Equestrians at the 1976 Summer Olympics
Sportspeople from Cádiz